Cristian Antonio Montecinos González (born 29 December 1970) is a Chilean former footballer who played as a striker for several teams in Chile, Colombia, Mexico, the United Arab Emirates and Qatar. He also played for the Chile national team.

Montecinos began his professional career in 1988. During his playing career he played for teams like Rangers, Unión Española, Deportes Temuco, Atlético Junior, Santos Laguna, Deportes Concepción, Cruz Azul, Colo-Colo, Necaxa, Puebla, Al Wasl, among others.

Montecinos was member of Chile's 23-man squad at 2001 Copa América, whilst the team was coached by Nelson Acosta.

Club career
A product of his hometown's team youth set-up, Rangers de Talca, he professionally debuted in 1988. That year he only played one game and didn't scored goals at the second-level (Primera B. Then, and now at top-level following the team's promotion, he netted seven goals in 21 participations.

In 1992, Montecinos was transferred to Unión Española, winning the cup title the same year. Two years later, he was hired by Deportes Temuco where was Copa Chile goalscorer with fifteen goals.

In 1994, he moved to Colombia to play for Atlético Junior. There he became a key player in a club where he had a teammates to players like Iván René Valenciano and Carlos Valderrama. During his spell at Barranquilla-based side between 1995 and 1994, Montecinos scored 16 goals, which allowed him to be recruited by Mexico's Santos Laguna for the 1996–97 season. He was part of Necaxa's squad that finished third in the 2000 FIFA Club World Championship. He scored against Manchester United and South Melbourne in the group stage.

International career
Montecinos represented the Chile national side during the Copa América 2001, scoring three goals in four games.

Personal life
Montecinos is the father of the Chile international footballer Joaquín Montecinos who was born in Colombia when he played for Junior de Barranquilla.

Honours

Club
Rangers
 Segunda División de Chile (1): 1988

Unión Española
 Copa Chile (1): 1992

Junior de Barranquilla
 Primera A (1): 1995

Santos Laguna
Mexico Primera Division: 1996 Invierno

Necaxa
FIFA Club World Cup: Third Place - 2000

References

External links
 

Living people
1970 births
People from Talca
Chilean footballers
Chile international footballers
Rangers de Talca footballers
Unión Española footballers
Deportes Temuco footballers
Atlético Junior footballers
Deportes Tolima footballers
Santos Laguna footballers
Deportes Concepción (Chile) footballers
Cruz Azul footballers
Colo-Colo footballers
Club Necaxa footballers
Club Puebla players
Al-Wasl F.C. players
Dubai CSC players
Al-Gharafa SC players
Al Wahda FC players
San Marcos de Arica footballers
Primera B de Chile players
Chilean Primera División players
Categoría Primera A players
Liga MX players
UAE Pro League players
UAE First Division League players
Qatar Stars League players
Chilean expatriate footballers
Chilean expatriate sportspeople in Colombia
Chilean expatriate sportspeople in Mexico
Chilean expatriate sportspeople in the United Arab Emirates
Chilean expatriate sportspeople in Qatar
Expatriate footballers in Colombia
Expatriate footballers in Mexico
Expatriate footballers in the United Arab Emirates
Expatriate footballers in Qatar
2001 Copa América players
Association football forwards